Magnus James Mowatt (13 March 1917 – 1979) was a Scottish professional footballer who played as an outside right in the Scottish League for Clyde and Dumbarton. He also played in the Football League for Lincoln City.

Career statistics

References

1917 births
1979 deaths
Scottish footballers
Dumbarton F.C. players
Clyde F.C. players
Brentford F.C. players
Lincoln City F.C. players
Scottish Football League players
English Football League players
Greenock Morton F.C. players
Association football outside forwards